Kotla Syedan or Kotla Saidan is a town and union council of Dera Ismail Khan District in Khyber Pakhtunkhwa province of Pakistan. It is located at 31°49'27N 70°50'52E and has an altitude of 164 metres (541 feet).

References

Union councils of Dera Ismail Khan District
Populated places in Dera Ismail Khan District